New Hits 96 is a compilation album released in 1996. As a part of the Hits compilation series, it contains UK hit singles from the winter and early spring months of 1996. The album reached number 1 on the UK compilations chart and stayed there for nine weeks.

New Hits 96 contains five songs that reached number one on the UK Singles Chart: "How Deep Is Your Love", "Return of the Mack", "Firestarter", "Up on the Roof" and "Don't Look Back in Anger".

The B-side to "Don't Look Back in Anger", Oasis' cover of Slade's "Cum On Feel the Noize", also features on the album.

Track listing

Disc one 
 Take That – "How Deep Is Your Love"
 Mark Morrison – "Return of the Mack"
 3T – "Anything"
 Chantay Savage – "I Will Survive"
 Robert Miles – "Children (Eat Me Edit)"
 The Prodigy – "Firestarter (Edit)"
 David Bowie & The Pet Shop Boys – "Hallo Spaceboy (Remix)"
 Gina G – "Ooh Aah... Just a Little Bit (Eurovision Song Contest Version)"
 Suggs – "Cecilia (Speeded Up Version)"
 PJ & Duncan – "Stepping Stone"
 Celine Dion – "Falling into You"
 TLC – "Creep"
 Coolio – "1, 2, 3, 4 Sumpin' New (Timber Mix)"
 Cher – "One by One (LP Version)"
 Annie Lennox feat. Paul Simon – "Something So Right"
 M People – "Search for the Hero (M People Radio Mix)"
 Everything but the Girl – "Missing (Todd Terry Club Mix) (Blanco/Eternal Radio Edit)"
 The Lightning Seeds – "Ready or Not"
 Etta James – "I Just Want to Make Love to You"
 Robson & Jerome – "Up on the Roof"

Disc two 
 Oasis – "Don't Look Back in Anger"
 Garbage – "Stupid Girl"
 Ash – "Goldfinger"
 Skunk Anansie – "Charity"
 Lush – "Ladykillers"
 The Wannadies – "You and Me Song"
 Ocean Colour Scene – "The Riverboat Song"
 The Presidents of the United States of America – "Lump"
 Dog Eat Dog – "No Fronts (Jam Master Jay's Main Edit)"
 Oasis – "Cum On Feel the Noize"
 Goldbug – "Whole Lotta Love (Radio Version)"
 Gat Decor – "Passion (Do You Want It Right Now Edit)"
 Sasha & Maria – "Be As One"
 Meltdown – "My Life Is In Your Hands"
 Harmonix – "Landslide (Original Mix)"
 Nightcrawlers – "Should I Ever (Fall in Love)"
 Republica – "Ready To Go"
 Molella feat. The Outhere Brothers – "If You Wanna Party (Original Mix) (Eternal Radio Edit)"
 Technohead – "I Wanna Be A Hippy (Flamman & Abraxas Radio Edit)"
 The Manchester United (1996) FA Cup Squad – "Move Move Move (The Red Tribe)"

External links 
 Discogs entry for New Hits 96

1996 compilation albums
Hits (compilation series) albums